Nee Bareda Kadambari is a 1985 Indian Kannada-language film directed and produced by Dwarakish in his directorial debut. The film stars Vishnuvardhan, Bhavya, Hema Chaudhary and C. R. Simha. The music was composed by Vijay Anand and the dialogues and lyrics were written by Chi. Udaya Shankar along with R. N. Jayagopal. The film is a remake of the Hindi film Pyar Jhukta Nahin (1985). Dwarakish also directed the Tamil remake Naan Adimai Illai.

Cast
 Vishnuvardhan
 Bhavya
 Hema Choudhary
 C. R. Simha
 Sundar Raj
 Uma Shivakumar
 Lohithaswa
 Umesh Hegde

Soundtrack
The music was composed by Vijay Anand.

References

External links
 

1985 films
1980s Kannada-language films
Kannada remakes of Hindi films
Indian romantic drama films
1985 directorial debut films
Films directed by Dwarakish
Kannada films remade in other languages
1985 romantic drama films